Euseius africanus is a species of mite in the family Phytoseiidae.

References

africanus
Articles created by Qbugbot
Animals described in 1954